Joseph Humphrey Winterbotham (1852-1925), was a Chicago manufacturer, bank director and Chicago Art Institute benefactor.

Early life
Joseph Humphrey Winterbotham was born in Columbus, Ohio, in 1852.

Career
Winterbotham "organized no fewer than eleven corporations, including cooperage manufacture, moving and transfer, and mortgage financing".

Personal life
He married Genevieve Baldwin (1853-1906) of New Haven, Connecticut, and they had four children, including Rue Winterbotham Carpenter.

Their sons John and Joseph, Jr. were educated at Yale University, and their daughters, Rue and Genevieve, travelled to Europe.

References

1852 births
1925 deaths
People from Columbus, Ohio